Bessone may refer to:

 Amo Bessone, American ice hockey player and coach.
 Ernesto Bessone, Argentine racing driver.
 Federico Bessone, Argentine footballer.
 Peter Bessone, American ice hockey player.
 Raymond Bessone, British celebrity hairdresser known as 'Mr Teasy-Weasy'.
 Max Bessone, Italian Designer, in New Zealand.

See also

 Besson (surname)